The 1981 Ireland rugby union tour of South Africa was a series of matches played by the Ireland national rugby union team in South Africa in May and June 1981. The Irish team played seven matches, of which they won three. They lost the Test Series 2–0 to the Springboks.

Matches 
Scores and results list Ireland's points tally first.

Ireland embarked on their first tour to South Africa after a twenty-year absence on the back of a five nations championship which they were widely considered to be favourites to win but ended with four defeats, having lost all their matches for the first time since 1977. Despite condemnation from political and ecclesiastical sources, the IRFU honoured their promise to undertake a seven match tour against multiracial sides and included twelve uncapped players as well as half a dozen former British and Irish Lions in the touring party. A number of players had resigned their posts when employers declined to grant leave of absence for the tour whilst others had no option but to simply declare their unavailability.

Of the seven matches played, the majority including both test matches were lost. Injuries to two key players proved difficult to overcome. John Robbie (later to become a non-capped Springbok) injured a shoulder in the first half of the opening fixture and only gained match fitness in the last few days of the tour whilst Ollie Campbell only played twice on tour, his replacement Mick Quinn having last played international rugby in March 1977.

Ahead of the Gazelles fixture (the SA U-24 side), much had been made of the attacking potential of the Irish three-quarters yet on the day the only points Ireland scored in front of a 35,000 crowd were through the boot of Kevin O'Brien as the tourists were outplayed in the line-out through the work of lock Skinner. There was nothing particularly undersized about the under-24 side featuring a number of future Springboks in their ranks including Jannie Breedt, the 21 stone Flippie van der Merwe and Piet Kruger as props and 6'9" Vleis Visagie at lock. Future Springbok coach Carel du Plessis scored one try from the wing playing alongside SARFF's Wilfred Cupido, one of four coloured players included in the list of the sixty-four trialists ahead of the three test series in New Zealand later on in the year.

The second fixture played at Olen Park -scene of Mike Slemen's unforgettable try during the 1980 BIRUT tour, saw Ireland take on fairly underwhelming opposition in the guise of the Gold Mining Invitation XV. Solomon Mhlaba, a tourist to the UK with the 1979 SA Baa Baas started at full back for the GMI but he saw little of the ball to demonstrate his attacking prowess as Ireland ran in seven tries with John Murphy contributing a total of eighteen points via his boot from fullback.

There were first caps for Murphy, Paul Dean and Jerry Holland at Newlands, a game which Ireland could undoubtedly have won, matching the Springbok pack in all phases of the game but they were seriously undermined and derailed by injuries to both Murphy and Campbell, which ultimately ruled both players out for the remainder of the tour. 

The Irish pack simply surpassed themselves throughout the second test at Kings Park with the back row of O'Driscoll, Slattery and Duggan quite magnificent as the bigger Springbok pack were outplayed in every phase of the game. Holding a 7–6 half time lead courtesy of a searing try from full back O'Brien and a Quinn penalty to a Botha drop goal and penalty, another Quinn penalty extended the lead out to 10–6. Yet a further two Botha drop goals were to deprive Ireland of their glory, as he became only the fourth player in history to drop three goals in a test, his final effort being only minutes from the end of the game.

Touring party 

Manager: P. Madigan
Assistant Manager: Tom Kiernan
Medical Officer: Dr. Malcolm Little (UCG RFC)
Captain: Fergus Slattery (Blackrock College)

Full backs
J J Murphy* (Greystones); K A O'Brien (Broughton Park);

Three-quarters
Freddie McLennan (Wanderers); Keith Crossan* (Instonians); David Irwin (Queen's University); A W Irwin* (Queens' University): J A Hewitt*(NIFC); Michael Kiernan*(Lansdowne); Terry Kennedy (St. Mary's College);

Half-backs
Paul Dean* (St.Mary's College); Ollie Campbell(Old Belvedere) [rep: M A M Quinn(Lansdowne)]; John Robbie (Greystones) [rep: J B O' Connor*(Palmerston)] Robbie McGrath (Wanderers);

Forwards
Phil Orr (Old Wesley); John Cantrell (UCD); Harry Harbison* (UCD); Gerry McLoughlin (Shannon); Des Fitzgerald* (Lansdowne); Brendan Foley (Shannon); J J Holland*(Cork Constitution); G H Wallace* (Old Wesley); John O'Driscoll (London Irish); Fergus Slattery (Blackrock College); R K Kearney* (Wanderers); Willie Duggan (Blackrock College); A F O'Leary* (Cork Constitution)

= selected as a previously uncapped tourist

See also
 Ireland vs South Africa at rugby union

References 

Ireland national rugby union team tours
Rugby union tours of South Africa
Ireland tour
Rugby union and apartheid
1981 in South African rugby union
Sports scandals in Ireland
1980–81 in Irish rugby union